Hapsidopareion is an extinct genus of microsaur belonging to the family Hapsidopareiidae. Fossils have been found in the early Permian of Oklahoma.

History of study 
Hapsidopareion was named in 1973 by American paleontologist Eleanor Daly based on material collected from the early Permian South Grandfield locality in southwestern Oklahoma. The genus name is given for the Greek hapsido- ('arch') and -pareion ('cheek'). The species name, H. lepton, is given for the slightness of the animal. The taxon is known from several partial to complete skulls and possibly by some isolated postcranial material.

Anatomy
Hapsidopareion was originally differentiated from other microsaurs by the large temporal emargination, which produced other variable morphology of the circum-emargination bones (e.g., postorbital). It is similar to the more recently described Llistrofus pricei in this regard, but can be differentiated from L. pricei by features such as the absence of a quadratojugal and a frontal excluded from the orbit. Because all specimens of H. lepton are notably smaller than those of L. pricei, and a number of anatomical differences are likely ontogenetically variable (e.g., contact between neural arch and centrum), it has been considered that the former maybe represent a juvenile of the latter, but recent workers have maintained the separation of these taxa.

Relationships 
Hapsidopareion is the sister taxon to Llistrofus pricei. Collectively, this group forms the Hapsidopareiidae (traditionally called the 'Hapsidopareiontidae') and is recognized by the greatly enlarged temporal emargination.

See also
 Prehistoric amphibian
 List of prehistoric amphibians

References

Microsauria